Oliva bifasciata is a species of sea snail, a marine gastropod mollusk in the family Olividae, the olives.

Synonyms
 Oliva bifasciata bollingi Clench, 1934: synonym of Americoliva nivosa bollingi (Clench, 1934) accepted as Oliva nivosa bollingi Clench, 1934 (basionym)
 Oliva bifasciata jenseni Petuch & Sargent, 1986: synonym of Americoliva nivosa nivosa (Marrat, 1871) accepted as Oliva nivosa nivosa Marrat, 1871

Distribution
This marine species occurs off Guadeloupe and Bermuda.

References

 Küster in Weinkauff (1878). Systematisches Conchylien Cabinet. Band V. Species 35, Plate 5, fig 11 
 Jensen, R. H. (1997). A Checklist and Bibliography of the Marine Molluscs of Bermuda. Unp. , 547 pp

bifasciata
Gastropods described in 1878